Lakshmipur or Laxmipur Sadar is an upazila of Lakshmipur District in the Division of Chittagong, Bangladesh.

Geography
It has a total area of 514.78 km2. Most of the land in Lakshmipur district is river bed or isles sedimented from the river or the Bay of Bengal, the names of different areas of the district are named adding suffixes like ‘Chor’, ‘Dee’, ‘Di’, ‘Dia’- meaning river bed.

Demographics

According to the 2011 Bangladesh census, Lakshmipur Sadar Upazila had 144,228 households and a population of 684,425, 12.3% of whom lived in urban areas. 11.4% of the population was under the age of 5. The literacy rate (age 7 and over) was 51.9%, compared to the national average of 51.8%.

Administration
Lakshmipur Sadar Upazila is divided into Lakshmipur Municipality and 19 union parishads: Bangakha, Basikpur, Bhabaniganj, Chandraganj, Char Ruhita, Charramani Mohan, Charshahi, Dakshin Hamchadi, Dalal Bazar, Datta Para, Dighali, Hajir Para, Kushakhali, Laharkandi, Mandari, Parbati Nagar, Shak Char, Uttar Hamchadi, and Uttar Joypur. The union parishads are subdivided into 226 mauzas and 258 villages.

Lakshmipur Municipality was established in 1976. It is subdivided into 12 wards and 22 mahallas.

Transport
 Moju Chowdhury Hat, transport hub
 Z1405 Lakshmipur-Ramgoti Road
Z1432 Mandari-Dasher Hat- Maijdee Road
 N809 Lakshmipur-Bhola-Barisal Road
 Z1422 Lakshmipur-Ramgonj Road
 R140 Lakshmipur-Noakhali-Chandpur Road

Education
 Abirnagar Mahmudia Madrasha
 Baralia High School, Baralia, Dattapara, Laksmipur
 Dattapara Ram Raton Bhohumukhi Adorsha High School
 Palerhat Public High School
 Bangakhan High School
 Birahimpur High School 
 Bhabanigonj College
 Bhabanigonj M.L. High School
 Bijoy Nagar High School
 Charshahi High School 
 Charshahi Islamia Alim Madrasa
 Dalal Bazar Degree College 
 Dalal Bazar Fatema Girls High School
 Dalal Bazar N.K High School
 Dattapara Degree College
 Dighali High School
 Hazir Hat Millat Academi
 Janata Degree college
 Khaguria High School
 Lakshmipur Adarsha Samad Government High School
 Lakshmipur Collegiate High School
 Lakshmipur Government College
 Lakshmipur Government Girl's High School
 Lakshmipur Government Women College
 Lakshmipur Private Polytechnic Institute
 Mandari Bohumukhi High School
 Nurullapur H. K. Islamia Dakhil Madrasa
 Nurullapur Anzuman Ara High School 
 Pal Para D M  High School
 Panpara High School, Ramgonj
 Principle Kazi Faruki School & College
 Protap Gonj High School, Chandragonj, Lakshmipur
 Radhapur High School
 Rampur High School
 Rawshan Jahan Eastern Medical College & Hospital, South Maguri, Dattapara
 Rupa Chara sofi ullah High School
 Titer kandi Bhuyanerhat Fazil Madrasha
Munshirhat S M High School
Dattapara Girls' High School
 Poura Shahid Smrity Academy High School. Shahapur 1 no word, Lakshmipur poura shova.
 Avinash Adrsha High School, South Tumchor, Ramgoti
Gopalpur Dharika High School

Religious institutions
Mosques 731, temples 3, churches 1, dargahs 1, tombs 3. Noted religious institutions:
 Shahapur Yousuf Munshi Jameh Masjid, 1 No word Lakshmipur poura shova.
 Majupur Matka Mosque, 
 South Shanki Bhanga Jameh Masjid,
 Tita Khan Mosque, Syedpur Jami Mosque,
 Madhu Banu Mosque, 
 Shree Shree Govinda Mahaprovu Jeu Akhra, 
 Joseph Church, 
 Lakshmi Narayan Baishnab Math.
 Dattapara Kalimata Debottor Mohongonj Asrom
 Sree Sree Sottonarayon Seba Mondir, Bottoli Bordhon Bari
 Sree Sree Sottonarayon Seba Mondir, Chowdhury Bari,Dattapara

NGO 
BRAC
ASA
COAST, Lakshmipur
VOICE
SHDO
CWDA
SWDA
TWSDA
SURGE
FRIENDSHIP
SOPIRET
Rhythm Bangladesh

Newspapers and periodicals

Online newspaper
www.lakshmipur24.com (2012)
www. (2023)
www.raipurnews24.com (2016)

Daily
Lakshmipur Kantha (1995)
Al-Chist (1995)
Malancha,
Rob,

Weekly
Natun Samaj (Natun Desh, 1973)
Elan (1982)
Natun Path (1987)
Damama (1992)
♦Bortoman Laxmipur (2012)

Monthly
Lakshmipur Barta (1989)
Bangla Awaj (2000)
Unnoyan Barta (2012) NGO Based

Defunct newspapers and periodicals
Mukti Bani (1928)
weekly Ganamukh (1973)
Chetana (1969)
weekly Ananda Akash (1995)
Prachchhad (1984)
Chhayapath
Kabita Barta

See also
 Districts of Bangladesh

References

Upazilas of Lakshmipur District